Dorstenia cayapia is a species of  plant in the family Moraceae which is native to Brazil and Bolivia.

References

cayapia
Flora of Bolivia
Flora of Brazil
Plants described in 1829
Endangered flora of South America